Eulimnadia antlei is a species of branchiopod in the family Limnadiidae.

References

Further reading

 

Spinicaudata
Crustaceans described in 1940